The given name "Marie" may refer to:

Academics 
 Marie-Françoise Guédon, Canadian anthropologist and professor of religious studies
Marie Louise Uhr, Australian biology and Catholic feminist
Marie Elisabeth Shaw, Rhode Scholar Candidate and Virginian author and Historian.

Actors 
Marie Bell, French actor and director
Marie Déa, French actor
Marie Göranzon, Swedish actor
Marie Nademlejnská, Czech actor
Marie Osmond, American actor and singer
Marie Wright (actress), British actor

Fiction 

Marie (Onegai), an anime character
Marie Barone, a fictional character in the popular sitcom Everybody Loves Raymond
 Marie Calvet, Megan Calvet Draper's mother in Mad Men
Marie, the lover of Meursault who is the main character in Albert Camus' novel The Stranger
Marie, the daughter of Duchess in the 1970 Disney animated feature The Aristocats
Marie, fictional supporting character in the long-running soap opera EastEnders
Marie, fictional character in the movie Paulie
Marie, fictional character in the Nadia: The Secret of Blue Water anime series
Marie, name attributed to fictional X-Men character Rogue in the films X-Men, X2: X-Men United, and X-Men: The Last Stand
Marie Parfacy, real name of the fictional character Soma Peries in the Gundam anime series, Mobile Suit Gundam 00
 Ultrawoman Marie, better known as Mother of Ultra, from the Ultraman Series;  true name revealed in the film Mega Monster Battle: Ultra Galaxy Legend
 Marie Schrader, fictional character played by Betsy Brandt in the television series Breaking Bad. Sister-in-law to main character Walter White.
 Marie Kanker, middle child of the Kanker sisters from Ed, Edd n Eddy.
 Marie, The teenage occupant of the Velvet Room in Persona 4: The Golden

Politicians and Public Service 
Marie-Guite Dufay, French politician
Marie-Hélène des Esgaulx, French politician
Marie Louise Coleiro Preca, president of Malta
Marie-Louise O'Donnell, Irish politician and broadcaster
Marie-Thérèse Hermange, French politician

Royalty 
 Marie Antoinette, last queen of France before the french revolution 
 Marie José of Belgium, last queen of Italy before the abolition of the Italian monarchy in 1946
 Marie of Romania, last Queen consort of Romania
 Marie Thérèse of France, daughter of Marie Antoinette and King Louis XVI

Scientist 
Marie Curie, Polish physicist and chemist

Sports 
Marie-Ève Pelletier, Canadian tennis player
Marie-José Pérec, French sprinter

Writers 
Madame d'Aulnoy, French writer
Marie Manning (writer), columnist and novelist

Other people 
 Marie Thérèse of Lisieux, French Roman Catholic nun
Marie Lachapelle, French mid-wife

See also 

 Marie (disambiguation)
 Marie (given name)
 Sainte-Marie (disambiguation)

Marie